Mendi Airport is an airport in Mendi, Papua New Guinea .

Airlines and destinations

Mendi Airport is one of the National Airport serving the people of SHP, HELA and part of ENGA. It is managed by National Airport Corporation(NAC).It currently serves the National Flag carrier, Air Niugini, PNG Air, South West Air Ltd and other fixed wing operators using the aerodrome.

The Airport is currently undergoing rehabilitation and renovation through a National Government funding.

References

Airports in Papua New Guinea
Southern Highlands Province